The South Africa women's cricket team played the New Zealand women's cricket team in January and February 2020. The tour consisted of three Women's One Day Internationals (WODIs), which formed part of the 2017–20 ICC Women's Championship, and five Women's Twenty20 International (WT20I) matches.

South Africa won the first two WODI matches to take an unassailable lead in the series. South Africa won the third and final WODI match by six wickets, to take the series 3–0. It was the first time that South Africa had whitewashed New Zealand in a WODI series. As a result of the 3–0 series win, South Africa qualified for the 2021 Women's Cricket World Cup. After their victory in the fourth WT20I match, New Zealand had a 3–1 lead, winning the series. New Zealand won the WT20I series 3–1, after the fifth match was abandoned due to rain.

Squads

WODI series

1st WODI

2nd WODI

3rd WODI

WT20I series

1st WT20I

2nd WT20I

3rd WT20I

4th WT20I

5th WT20I

Notes

References

External links
 Series home at ESPN Cricinfo

2020 in women's cricket
2017–20 ICC Women's Championship
2020 in New Zealand cricket
2020 in South African cricket
International cricket competitions in 2019–20
New Zealand 2019-30
South Africa 2019-20
January 2020 sports events in New Zealand
February 2020 sports events in New Zealand